Takanotsuru Shinichi  (born 18 June 1976 as Shinichi Sekiyama) is a former sumo wrestler from Izumi, Kagoshima, Japan. He made his professional debut in March 1992, and reached the top division in January 2003. His highest rank was maegashira 8. He retired in May 2006 and became an elder in the Japan Sumo Association coaching at Naruto stable.

Career
He was the eldest son of a barber. Both his parents were deaf so he learned Japanese sign language before he could even write properly. He did judo in middle school, with no sumo experience. He was recruited by the former yokozuna Takanosato who happened to be in Izumi City and initially took in a friend of his before being told by him there was another boy even bigger. He began his sumo career in March 1992 at Naruto stable, joining at the same time as Wakanosato and Takanowaka. He had had problems with his right foot since childhood, and had to have foot surgery in September 1995, forcing him to miss two tournaments and fall from sandanme to jonidan. He returned to win the jonidan championship with a 7-0 record, but continued to feel pain, this time in both legs, and underwent a second, major surgery which involved cutting off both big toes to remove the nerves and then re-attaching them. He was hospitalized for 11 months, in such acute pain that he could not walk, and missed five straight tournaments. He began his career all over again in May 1997, having fallen off the banzuke completely, and was eventually promoted to the jūryō division after the January 2001 tournament. He reached the top makuuchi division in January 2003. 

Takanotsuru scored 9-6 in his top division debut, but in July 2003 a disastrous 0-11-4 record due to a dislocated shoulder saw him demoted to jūryō, and the following tournament he was demoted again to makushita. He had to move out of his private room at the stable and go back to the communal quarters for low rankers, and had to do tsukebito duties again for Wakanosato. However, he returned to jūryō after a 6-1 record in September 2003, and in September 2004 was promoted back to makuuchi. His fifth and final top division tournament was in November 2004. He remained in jūryō until March 2006, when a score of just one win against fourteen losses saw him demoted back to makushita.

Retirement from sumo
After six straight losses in the May 2006 tournament, Takanotsuru announced his retirement and became an elder of the Japan Sumo Association. He had jun-toshiyori status for a year and then borrowed the Nishiiwa kabu from May 2007. He became Naruto Oyakata and took over as stablemaster of Naruto when the previous stablemaster (ex-yokozuna Takanosato) died in November 2011. Due to a dispute with Takanosato's widow over who owned the Naruto stock he changed his oyakata name to Tagonoura in December 2013 and changed the stable name to Tagonoura stable. He oversaw the promotion of Kisenosato to yokozuna in January 2017, and Takayasu to ōzeki in May of the same year. He commented on Kisenosato's retirement in January 2019, "I was delighted when he became yokozuna but when you see him closely, you can tell that he was struggling a lot. These two years went like a flash."

Tagonoura and his wife divorced after she had an affair with one of Tagonoura stable's wrestlers in September 2019. He was criticized after a photo emerged of him drunk and asleep in a restaurant during the July 2020 tournament, despite the Sumo Association's instructions for all its members to make unnecessary trips outside of their stables during the COVID-19 pandemic.

Fighting style
Takanotsuru was a yotsu-sumo specialist who usually won by yorikiri or force out. His preferred grip on his opponent's mawashi was hidari-yotsu, a right hand outside, left hand inside position. He was often compared to Tōki, due to their similar build and appearance, with both sporting distinctive sideburns. The two met eight times in total in the ring, with Takanotsuru holding a 5-3 advantage. However their fighting styles were quite different, with Tōki preferring pushing and thrusting techniques.

Career record

See also
Glossary of sumo terms
List of past sumo wrestlers
List of sumo elders

References

External links

1976 births
Living people
Japanese sumo wrestlers
Sumo people from Kagoshima Prefecture